is a town located in Kushiro Subprefecture, Hokkaido, Japan. As of April 30, 2017, it has an estimated population of 19,941,  and an area of 252.57 km2.

History 
 1920: Kushiro Village split from old Kushiro Town (now Kushiro City).
 1955: Konbumori Village merges with Kushiro Village.
 1980: Kushiro Village becomes Kushiro Town.

References

External links
 
 Official Website 

 
Towns in Hokkaido